El Ouldja is a town and commune in Sétif Province, Algeria.

References

Communes of Sétif Province